The 2001 FIBA Americas Championship for Women, was the sixth FIBA Americas Championship for Women regional basketball championship held by FIBA Americas, which also served as Americas qualifier for the 2002 FIBA World Championship for Women, granting berths to the top three teams in the final standings. It was held in Brazil between 10 September and 15 September 2001. Six national teams entered the event under the auspices of FIBA Americas, the sport's regional governing body. The city of São Luís hosted the tournament. Brazil won their second title after defeating Cuba in the final.

Format
Teams were split into two round-robin groups of three teams each. The top two teams from each group advanced to the second stage, which consisted of another round-robin group where the results between teams from the same group in the preliminary stage were carried over. The first two teams from the second stage group qualified directly to the 2002 FIBA World Championship for Women and played an extra game for the championship. Third and fourth places were defined by the standings in the second stage group.
The teams that did not get past the first round played an extra game to define fifth place.

Squads

First round

Group A

|}

Group B

|}

Fifth place

Second round

|}

Final

Final standings

External links
2001 Championship of the Americas for Women, FIBA.com. Retrieved January 22, 2015.

FIBA Women's AmeriCup
2001 in women's basketball
2001 in Brazilian sport
International women's basketball competitions hosted by Brazil
2001–02 in North American basketball
2001–02 in South American basketball